Tabor is a village in western Slovenia in the Municipality of Nova Gorica. It is located on a small hill overlooking the Vipava Valley. The name comes from the Slovene term tabor, denoting a fortified church or village. The village was fortified in the 16th century as a defense against the Ottoman raids. Part of the fortifications are still visible today.

Tabor gravitates towards the village of Dornberk.

References

External links
 
Tabor on Geopedia

Populated places in the City Municipality of Nova Gorica